Ravenea delicatula is a species of palm tree. It is endemic to Madagascar, where it grows in a single location in northwest Madagascar, just east of a town called Andilamena. Here, it grows in a tropical montane forest among bamboo and pandans. There are only about 30 mature trees known in their natural range.

References

delicatula
Endemic flora of Madagascar
Critically endangered flora of Africa